The 1994 British League season was the 60th season of the top tier of speedway in the United Kingdom and the 30th and final season known as the British League.

Summary
Poole Pirates dominated the league and won the title finishing 15 points clear of nearest rivals Eastbourne Eagles. The Pirates last top league success had been back in 1969 and it was thanks to solid performances throughout the season from their Australian pair; new signing from Swindon Jason Crump and Craig Boyce. They were backed up by Norwegian Lars Gunnestad and Londoner Steve Schofield.

Final table
M = Matches; W = Wins; D = Draws; L = Losses; Pts = Total Points

British League Knockout Cup
The 1994 British League Knockout Cup was the 56th edition of the Knockout Cup for tier one teams. Eastbourne Eagles were the winners for a third consecutive year.

First round

Quarter-finals

Semi-finals

Final

First leg

Second leg

Eastbourne were declared Knockout Cup Champions, winning on aggregate 106-86.

Leading averages

Riders & final averages
Arena Essex

 9.79
 8.26
 6.28
 5.99
 4.78
 4.71
 4.14
 4.00
 2.57
 2.00

Belle Vue

 9.64
 7.79
 7.14
 6.13
 5.97
 5.94
 5.84
 5.05
 3.00

Bradford

 9.65
 9.59
 7.32
 7.06
 4.62
 3.10
 3.07
 2.68

Coventry

 9.98
 8.46
 8.10
 6.45
 5.83
 4.24
 3.23
 1.57
 1.57

Cradley Heath

 9.29
 8.68
 8.64
 8.00
 7.78
 4.98
 4.40
 3.94
 1.93
 1.27
 1.04

Eastbourne

 9.33
 9.18
 8.98
 7.41
 6.30
 4.42
 3.18
 2.98

Ipswich

 8.34
 8.08
 7.92
 7.07
 6.14
 5.49
 4.41

King's Lynn

 9.46
 8.33 
 6.96
 6.68
 5.75
 4.37
 4.00
 3.36

Poole

 9.30
 9.08
 8.77
 7.92
 5.85
 5.71
 3.44
 2.37

Reading

 10.41
 8.44
 7.65
 5.83
 5.15
 5.08
 4.43
 2.61

Wolverhampton

 9.83
 8.52
 7.47
 6.94
 5.28
 4.40
 4.34
 2.82

See also
List of United Kingdom Speedway League Champions
Knockout Cup (speedway)

References

British League
1994 in British motorsport
1994 in speedway